This is a list of places on the Victorian Heritage Register in the Shire of South Gippsland in Victoria, Australia. The Victorian Heritage Register is maintained by the Heritage Council of Victoria.

The Victorian Heritage Register, as of 2021, lists the following nine state-registered places within the Shire of South Gippsland:

References 

South Gippsland
+